Soluna was a music group (1998–2004) consisting of four members, all of Hispanic descent.

Soluna may also refer to:
 Soluna Samay (born 1990), Guatemalan-Danish singer
 Toyota Tercel, a car, also known as Toyota Soluna

See also
 Luna (disambiguation)
 Sol (disambiguation)
 Solun (disambiguation)